Yevgeni Anatolyevich Konyukhov (born 21 November 1986) is a Russian professional football player. He plays as a goalkeeper for Uzbekistani club FC Neftchi Fergana.

Club career
He made his debut in the Russian Professional Football League for FC Torpedo Vladimir on 20 April 2008 in a game against FC MVD Rossii Moscow.
He made his Russian Football National League debut for FC Nizhny Novgorod on 18 April 2010 in a game against FC Dynamo Bryansk.
He made his Russian Premier League debut for PFC Krylia Sovetov Samara on 19 July 2015 in a game against FC Anzhi Makhachkala.

References

External links
 
 Profile by Football National League

1986 births
People from Murom
Sportspeople from Vladimir Oblast
Living people
Russian footballers
Association football goalkeepers
FC Nizhny Novgorod (2007) players
FC Sibir Novosibirsk players
FC Tyumen players
FC Torpedo Moscow players
PFC Krylia Sovetov Samara players
FC Tom Tomsk players
FC SKA Rostov-on-Don players
FK Neftchi Farg'ona players
FC Torpedo Vladimir players
Russian Premier League players
Russian First League players
Russian Second League players
Uzbekistan Super League players
Russian expatriate footballers
Expatriate footballers in Uzbekistan
Russian expatriate sportspeople in Uzbekistan